Metal Fatigue (also known as Metal Conflict), is a futuristic science fiction, real-time strategy computer game developed by Zono and published by Psygnosis (in Europe) and TalonSoft (in the United States).

The game was re-released on June 21, 2018 on GOG.com and Steam by Nightdive Studios, who had acquired the rights to the game.

Plot
During the 23rd century, man has discovered faster-than-light travel and has finally reached the stars. Galactic exploration had confirmed man's worst two fears. First, a warlike, alien race with vastly superior technology does exist. The exploration fleet reported sentient structures which appear to have been annihilated eons ago, scattered all over the galaxy.

Incidentally, the exploration consisted of vessels from three large Earth corporations or, as they are called in the game, CorpoNations (Rimtech, Mil-Agro, and Neuropa). It began as an industrial alliance, and the opportunity to plunder alien technology spurred them onward towards the Hedoth homeworld. As survey ships finally reached the Hedoth sector, the three CorpoNations massed their war fleets nearby. They were prepared for the ultimate conflict, only to discover that man's second worst fear was realized—that humanity is all alone in the universe; the Hedoth homeworlds were vacant.

The Hedoth initially left no clue of where they went, but their departure was remarkably tidy. Scattered installations and miscellaneous war machines were all they left behind.

The discovery set off a frenzied "gold rush" among the three CorpoNations for the Hedoth technology and its potential power.

At the end of the game, the Hedoth revealed that the humans were merely being tested, to see if they were worthy of being soldiers in the Hedoth's armies. The Hedoth concluded that humans would make excellent soldiers in the Hedoth armies, and that "Humanity is ready to learn obedience."

Gameplay
The game is fully 3D, mapped by an invisible grid; vehicles tilt to meet hilly terrain, and projectiles can be realistically blocked by obstructions. The camera is free-moving and can zoom in and out, rotate, and pan up or down while navigating the battlefield.

In the game, the usual real-time strategy elements such as base building and resource gathering are followed, but Metal Fatigue differs from the other titles by offering players to do battle with giant high-tech mech-style juggernauts called Combots.

Combots can be customized by four main combot parts: a torso, a single pair of legs, and two separate pieces of arm (excluding the combot pilots). The game also allows players to salvage destroyed enemy Combots and their various parts. Salvaged parts can be grafted onto the player's own combots (either by a combot in the field, or brought back and built into a new one,) and, more importantly, they can be researched and reverse-engineered, adding the component into the player's technology base.

In-game, units are unable to increase in rank through experience. However, after a completion of a single-player mission, the player is given points that could be used to upgrade combot pilots, vehicles or structures.

The game also places an emphasis on multi-level warfare. The battlefield is divided into three layers of combat: an orbital level, a surface level and an underground level. Combots with flight capabilities are able to traverse at will between the orbital level and the surface level. Only vehicles are able to traverse the underground level, which must be entered from the surface, although a vehicle production facility can be built after an elevator has been built by a drill unit and builder units have been sent down.

Reception

Gordon Barrick of PC Gaming World wrote, "Although it falls between two stools and can be repetitive at times, Metal Fatigue still provides moments of adrenaline-surged fun which outweigh its general faults."

References

External links

Metal Fatigue on Metacritic

2000 video games
Video games about mecha
Psygnosis games
Real-time strategy video games
Science fiction video games
Video games developed in the United States
Video games set in the 23rd century
Windows games
Windows-only games
Multiplayer and single-player video games
TalonSoft games